Lachnomyrmex lattkei is a species of ant in the subfamily Myrmicinae.

References

External links

Myrmicinae
Insects described in 2008